Sophie Nsavyimana is a Burundian Politician and a representative in the East African Legislative Assembly.

References

Burundian women in politics
Living people
Members of the East African Legislative Assembly
Year of birth missing (living people)
Place of birth missing (living people)